Korea's Next Top Model: Guys & Girls, is the final season of the Korean reality television show in which a number of women and men compete for the title of Korea's Next Top Model and a chance to start their career in the modelling industry. This is also the first season to feature male contestants.

This season featured sixteen contestants in its final cast. The prizes for this season included: A cash prize of 100,000,000 Korean won, a cover shoot and editorial in W Magazine Korea, a modelling contract with ESteem Entertainment and additional benefits for the winner of the season.

The international destination for the season was Toronto, Ontario, Canada. The winner of the competition was 23-year-old Hwang Kibbeum.

Contestants
(ages stated are at start of contest and use the Korean system of determining age)

Episode Guide

Episode 1
Original airdate: August 16, 2014
 First call-out: Hwang Kibbeum
 Bottom Two: Choi Ji-in & Han Jian
 Eliminated: Choi Ji-in
 Special Guest: Tyra Banks, Han Hye-yeon, Kim Jin-kyung, Jung Ho-yeon, Hwang Hyeon-ju, Kim Hye-ah

Episode 2
Original airdate: August 23, 2014
 First call-out: Bahng Tae-eun
 Bottom Two: Jung So-hyun & Jeong Yong-soo
 Eliminated: Jung So-hyun
 Special Guest: Choi Yong-bin, Jo Min-ho

Episode 3
Original airdate: August 30, 2014

 First call-out: Han Seung-soo
 Bottom Two: Chung Dong-kyu & Jeong Yong-soo
 Eliminated: Chung Dong-kyu
 Featured director: Digipedi
 Special Guest: Beenzino

Episode 4
Original airdate: September 6, 2014

 First call-out: Lee Cheol-woo
 Bottom Two: Han Jian & Shin Jae-hyuk
 Eliminated: Shin Jae-hyuk
 Featured photographer: Jo Sun-hee
 Special Guest: Kim Da-Hyeon

Episode 5
Original airdate: September 13, 2014
 Challenge winner: Hwang Kibbeum
 Bottom Three: Choi Jeong-jin, Han Jian, Kim Jong-hoon
 Eliminated outside of judging panel: Han Jian
 First call-out: Han Seung-soo & Hwang Kibbeum
 Bottom Two: Kim Seung-hee & Kim Yaelim
 Eliminated: Kim Seung-hee
 Featured photographer: Sasu Tei (challenge), Kim Dae-guk (photo shoot)

Episode 6
Original airdate: September 20, 2014

 First call-out: Hyeon Ji-eun
 Bottom Two: Kim Jong-hoon & Kim Yaelim
 Eliminated: Kim Jong-hoon
 Featured photographer: Im Jae-won
 Special Guest: Tyra Banks, Ricky Kim

Episode 7
Original airdate: September 27, 2014
 First call-out: Han Seung-soo
 Bottom Three: Bahng Tae-eun, Kim Yaelim & Lee Cheol-woo
 Eliminated: Bahng Tae-eun & Kim Yaelim
 Featured photographer: Hong-roo

Episode 8
Original airdate: October 4, 2014

 First call-out: Kim Min-jung
 Bottom Two: Choi Jeong-jin & Jeong Yong-soo
 Eliminated: Choi Jeong-jin
 Featured photographer: Kim Yoo-jin
 Special Guest: Ahn Young-Mi, Sunny Hong, Jung Yoon-gi

Episode 9
Original airdate: October 11, 2014
 First call-out: Hyeon Ji-eun
 Bottom Two: Jeong Yong-soo & Lee Cheol-woo
 Eliminated: Jeong Yong-soo
 Featured Photographer: Jang Yoon-jae
 Special Guest: Park Soo-joo

Episode 10
Original airdate: October 18, 2014
 First call-out: Lee Cheol-woo
 Bottom Three: Hwang Kibbeum, Hyeon Ji-eun & Kim Min-jung
 Eliminated: Hyeon Ji-eun & Kim Min-jung
 Featured Photographer: Kim Jung-myeong
 Special Guest: Go Si-Hyeon

Episode 11
Original airdate: October 25, 2014

Runway and talk show episode.
 Top Three: Han Seung-soo, Hwang Kibbeum, & Lee Cheol-woo
 Special Guest: Jo Min-ho, Song Hae-na, Kim Jin-kyung, Jung Ho-yeon, Hwang Hyeon-ju, Eun Ji-won, Han Ji-Hyeon, Yoon Choon-ho, Kwon Mun-soo

Episode 12
Original airdate: November 1, 2014
 Top three: Han Seung-soo, Hwang Kibbeum & Lee Cheol-woo
 Korea's Next Top Model: Hwang Kibbeum
 Featured Photographer: Jin Hyeong-beok
 Special Guest: Hwang Hyeon-ju & Kim Hye-a

Summaries

Call-out order

 The contestant was eliminated
 The contestant was eliminated outside of judging panel
 The contestant won the competition
 In episode 5, there were two separate eliminations. The first took place outside of judging panel after a runway challenge, where Jian was eliminated. The second was a regular elimination, and it took place at panel.
 Episodes 7 & 10 featured double eliminations with the bottom three contestants being in danger of elimination.
 Episode 11 was a runway and talk show episode.

Average  call-out order
Casting call & Episode 13 is not included.

Bottom two/three

 The contestant was eliminated after her first time in the bottom two/three
 The contestant was eliminated after her second time in the bottom two/three
 The contestant was eliminated after there third time in the bottom two/three 
 The contestant was eliminated after his/her fourth time in the bottom two/three 
 The contestant was eliminated in the final judging and placed as the runner-up

Photo Shoot Guide
 Episode 1 Photo shoot: Promotional Pictures
 Episode 2 Photo shoot: Hydrant Gymnastics
 Episode 3 Music Video: How Do I Look?
 Episode 4 Photo shoot: Gender Bending
 Episode 5 Photo shoot: Flying Fabric Full Body & Beauty Shots
 Episode 6 Photo shoot: Modeling on Stilts in Pairs
 Episode 7 Photo shoot: Futuristic Post-Apocalypse
 Episode 8 Photo shoot: High Fashion with DreamWorks Characters
 Episode 9 Photo shoot: Masquerade at Casa Loma
 Episode 10 Photo shoot: Luxury on a Yacht
 Episode 12 Photo shoots: W Magazine Covers; Nude Tiffany & Co. Jewelry ads

Makeovers
 Cheol-woo: Bleached blonde
 Dong-kyu: Fade haircut
 Jae-hyuk: Two-block part cut
 Jeong-jin: Asymmetrical regent cut
 Jian: Boyish short hair
 Ji-eun: Asymmetrical bob cut
 Jong-hoon: Dyed two-block cut
 Kibbeum: Dyed light brown and layered
 Min-jung: Pageboy haircut
 Seung-hee: Two-tone dyed hair
 Seung-soo: Buzz cut
 Tae-eun: Shaved on one side
 Yaelim: Pixie cut
 Yong-soo: Dandy cut

References

Korea's Next Top Model
2014 South Korean television seasons